An imperial election was held in Cologne on 5 January 1531 to select the emperor of the Holy Roman Empire.

Background 
This was the second imperial election to take place during the Reformation.  On October 31, 1517, Martin Luther, a professor of moral theology at the University of Wittenberg, now part of the Martin Luther University of Halle-Wittenberg, had delivered the Ninety-five Theses to Albert of Brandenburg, the Archbishop-Elector of Mainz.  This list of propositions criticized the practice of selling indulgences, remissions of the punishment meted out for sin in Purgatory.  Luther's criticism snowballed into a massive schism in the church.  In 1527, John, Elector of Saxony, established a Lutheran state church in Saxony with the elector as chief bishop.

The Holy Roman Emperor Charles V, Holy Roman Emperor called for the election of his successor.  The prince-electors called to Cologne for this occasion were:

 Albert of Brandenburg, Archbishop-Elector of Mainz
 Richard von Greiffenklau zu Vollrads, Archbishop-Elector of Trier
 Hermann of Wied, Archbishop-Elector  of Cologne
 Ferdinand, younger brother of Charles and King of Bohemia
 Louis V, Elector of the Electoral Palatinate
 John, Elector of Saxony
 Joachim I Nestor, Elector of Brandenburg

John remained the only Protestant.  Hermann, though a bishop, showed reforming tendencies, and would eventually be deposed from his episcopate in 1546.  The remaining electors were strongly pro-Catholic.

Charles had called the election by the terms of the Habsburg compact of 1521-1522 signed with his younger brother Ferdinand, according to which he was expected to call for an Imperial election after he was crowned by the Pope. The coronation took place in 1530, and Charles convoked the seven princes to elect Ferdinand.

Election and aftermath 

Ferdinand was elected King of the Romans in the city of Cologne. Charles continued to be Holy Roman Emperor for over 25 years. In 1550, he regretted the election as he realized that it would have led to the division of the House of Austria between his son Philip II of Spain and Ferdinand. He therefore contracted with his family in 1551 that Philip was the successor of Ferdinand. Charles also tried to arrange political marriages to maintain the unity of the Habsburgs.

However, Charles V abdicated on August 27, 1556. The Imperial Diet accepted his abdication on May 3, 1558. Ferdinand was crowned at Frankfurt. Philip did not succeed Ferdinand.  His successor, Maximilian II, Holy Roman Emperor and son of Ferdinand, was chosen during his reign in the imperial election of 1562. The electors, fearing the instability that would have resulted in having an absentee Spanish-speaking emperor born in Valladolid, had lobbied instead for Maximilian.

References

1531
1531 in the Holy Roman Empire
16th-century elections
Non-partisan elections
Charles V, Holy Roman Emperor
Ferdinand I, Holy Roman Emperor